Ernakulam District is a district of the state of Kerala in southern India.  The district headquarters are at Kakkanad.  The district includes the city of Kochi, an important seaport.

 Sree Sankaracharya Ashram: located at Kaladi, 30 km from Cochin.
 Chottanikkara Temple|Chottanikkara Bhagawati Temple: enshrines Bhagawati - the mother Goddess, one of the most popular deities in Kerala. The town of Chotanikkara is located near the city of Ernakulam. En route is the Poornatrayesa Temple at Tripunittura.
 Sree Bhagavathi Temple: located at Kothakulangara-Thiruvithamcore devaswam Board Major Temple having ancient history.  A large banyan tree with jackfruit, mango, athi trees inside.
 Poornatrayesa Temple: located at Thrippunithara.
 The Lakshmana Perumaal Temple: located at Tirumoozhikkalam near Alwaye and Kaaladi.
 Iriangol Bhawagati Temple: located at Perumbavoor near Alwaye.
 Ayyappa Temple: located at Perumbavoor.
 Sri Muruga Temple: located at Kuruppampady near Perumbavoor.
 Kannamkulangara Vishnu Temple: located at North Paravur.
 Kottuvallikkavu Bhagwati Temple: located at Kottuvally near North Paravur.
 Mahadevar Temple: located at Ernakulam.
 Mar Thoma Cheria Pally: located at Kothamangalam.
 Edapally Ganapathy Temple: located in Edapally near Ernakulam.
 Marattil Kottaram Bhagawathi Temple: located at Maradu near Tripunithura.
 Mookambika Temple: located at Paravur near Cochin.
 Mukkannur Kuttala Temple: located at Kothakulangara North near Karukutty (Angamali).
 Onakkoor Bhagawati Temple: Located at Onakkur (Piravom).
 Pandara Parambu Shiva Temple: located at Ernakulam (Mulavukkadu).
 Pandavathu Shiva Temple: located at Maradu near Tripunithura.
 Pariyaram Vishnu Temple: located at Aikernad near Tripunithura.
 Perumankavu Bhagawati Temple: located at Arakuzha near Aluva.
 Tirumaradi Durga Temple: located at Piravom near Ernakulam.
 Thrikariyur Shiva Temple: located at Thrikkariyoor (Kothamangalam) near Ernakulam.
 Thrikkara Temple: located at Thrikkara near Alwaye and Kochi.
 Edathal Painaat Sree Durga Temple: located at Edathala near Alwaye Aluva - Pookkattupady Route 10 km.
 Edahala Sree Kurumbakkavu Bhagavathy Temple: located at Edathala near Alwaye Aluva - Pookkattupady Route 11 km.
 Kallil Jain Temple: 13 km away from Perumbavoor. Very old. One of the few Jain temples in Kerala.
 Mulanthuruthy Mar Thoman Church: established between 1110 and 1125.
 Kadamattom Church : 10th century church; has Kadamattathu Kathanar and the Persian Cross.
 Kottoor Church: 4/5th century church.
 St Francis Church: first church constructed by the Portuguese in India. Located at Fort Cochin.
 Roman Catholic Church: has paintings. Located near the St Francis Church.
 St. Mary's Cathedral Basilica: head of Syro-Malabar Eastern Catholic Church, with communion with Roman Catholic Church in Vatican.
 St. George Church Edappally
 St. George Jacobite Syrian Cathedral, Karingachira: established AD722. 8 km from Ernakulam City.
 Marth Mariam Cathedral Kandanad (Kizhakkinde Yerushulem). The Marth Mariam Church of Kandanad is believed to be about 600 years old. Since its inception, the church was renovated, remodeled and rebuilt on several occasions and the edifice in its present magnificent form appears to have been completed in AD 1910.
 St. Marys Church, Nagapuzha, Vazhakulam via Muvattupuzha
 St. George Church, Kadamattom: built in the 9th century situated near Kolenchery, Moovattupuzha
 Holy Magi Church, Piravom
 Jewish Synagogue: built in 1568 at Mattancherry.  Chinese ceramics and old testament are attractions here.
 Malayattoor: church constructed in memory of the visit of St Thomas. Every year thousands of believers visit here, mainly during the Easter season.
 Malekkurish Church Pallikkara: commonly known as "Malekkurish Palli" is a Mar Thomman Pilgrim Center situated at Pallikkara, Cochin.It was established in the holy memories of St. Mary, St. Thomas, St. George and Parumala Mar Gregorious Thirumeni. It is home for people of various religions.

Lists of tourist attractions in Kerala
Religion in Ernakulam district
Districts of India-related lists
Tourist attractions in Ernakulam district